The 2013–14 Cypriot Cup was the 72nd edition of the Cypriot Cup. A total of 30 clubs entered the competition. It began on 23 October 2013 with the first round and concluded on 21 May 2014 with the final which was held at GSP Stadium. APOEL won their 20th Cypriot Cup trophy after beating Ermis Aradippou 2–0 in the final.

Format
In the 2013–14 Cypriot Cup, participated all the teams of the Cypriot First Division and the Cypriot Second Division (Divisions B1 and B2). Teams from the two lower divisions (Third and Fourth) competed in a separate cup competition.

The competition consisted of five rounds. In the first round each tie was played as a single leg and was held at the home ground of the one of the two teams, according to the draw results. Each tie winner was qualifying to the next round. If a match was drawn, extra time was following. If extra time was drawn, there was a replay at the ground of the team who were away for the first game. If the rematch was also drawn, then extra time was following and if the match remained drawn after extra time the winner was decided by penalty shoot-out.

The next three rounds were played in a two-legged format, each team playing a home and an away match against their opponent. The team which scored more goals on aggregate, was qualifying to the next round. If the two teams scored the same number of goals on aggregate, then the team which scored more goals away from home was advancing to the next round. 
 
If both teams had scored the same number of home and away goals, then extra time was following after the end of the second leg match. If during the extra thirty minutes both teams had managed to score, but they had scored the same number of goals, then the team who scored the away goals was advancing to the next round (i.e. the team which was playing away). If there weren't scored any goals during extra time, the qualifying team was determined by penalty shoot-out.

The final was a single match.

The cup winner secured a place in the 2014–15 UEFA Europa League.

First round
The first round draw took place on 10 October 2013 and the matches played on 23, 30 October and 19 December 2013.

Second round
The second round draw took place on 20 December 2013 and the matches played on 8, 15, 22 and 29 January 2014.

The following two teams advanced directly to second round, meeting the fourteen winners of first round ties:

Apollon Limassol (2012–13 Cypriot Cup winner)
AEL Limassol (2012–13 Cypriot Cup finalist)

|}

First leg

Second leg

Quarter-finals
The quarter-finals draw took place on 30 January 2014 and the matches played on 12, 19, 26 February and 12 March 2014.

|}

First legs

Second legs

Semi-finals
The semi-finals draw took place on 26 March 2014 and the matches will be played on 2 and 9 April 2014.

|}

First leg

Second leg

Final

See also
 Cypriot Cup
 2013–14 Cypriot First Division
 2013–14 Cypriot Second Division

Notes

References

Sources
 

Cypriot Cup seasons
2013–14 domestic association football cups
2013–14 in Cypriot football